Ahmed Amran is a Yemeni writer. He has a PhD in mineral exploration and mining. In 2000, he published a short story collection titled A New Horizon for a Newer World. A story from that book ("A Poet and a Dancer") was translated into Italian, and included in a 2009 anthology of Yemeni literature called Perle dello Yemen.
 
Amran lived in Hungary for many years.

References

Yemeni writers
Year of birth missing (living people)
Living people
Place of birth missing (living people)